James Christopher Harris (born 28 June 1979) is a Welsh professional footballer.

Harris began his football career at local football side Mumbles Rangers before joining Swansea City in 1996. He impressed in a trial game against Swindon Town and manager Jan Molby offered him a two-year contract; he later went out on loan to Merthyr Tydfil to gain some first-team experience. When his contract at Swansea expired, he had short spells at Rhayader Town and Haverfordwest County.

He moved to Bohemians (Bohs) in 1999 and scored on his debut away to Waterford United in a 2–0 victory. He spent one season at Bohs, making 24 league appearances and scoring four league goals before moving to St Patrick's Athletic. He signed for Scottish club Dunfermline Athletic on 28 January 2007 on a free transfer, having previously been at League of Ireland side Shelbourne with whom he won three league titles.

Harris left Dunfermline in January 2008 and he then re-signed for St Patrick's Athletic.

His late grandfather Rory Keane was a Republic of Ireland international player.

Honours
 League of Ireland: 3
 Shelbourne 2003, 2004, 2006

See also
Dunfermline Athletic F.C. season 2007-08

References

External links

Jamie Harris' DAFC player profile

Living people
1979 births
Welsh footballers
Welsh expatriate footballers
Swansea City A.F.C. players
Rhayader Town F.C. players
Bohemian F.C. players
St Patrick's Athletic F.C. players
Shelbourne F.C. players
League of Ireland players
Scottish Football League players
Scottish Premier League players
Dunfermline Athletic F.C. players
Welsh people of Irish descent
English Football League players
Association football defenders
Expatriate association footballers in the Republic of Ireland
Welsh expatriate sportspeople in Ireland
Haverfordwest County A.F.C. players